The Southland Conference softball tournament is the conference championship tournament in college softball for the Southland Conference (SLC). It is a double-elimination tournament and seeding is based on regular season records. The winner receives the conference's automatic bid to the NCAA Division I softball tournament.

Tournament
The Southland Conference softball tournament is a double-elimination tournament held each year at various SLC campus stadiums. All SLC softball teams participate in the tournament (barring NCAA sanctions). Of the eight current members, only the University of New Orleans does not sponsor softball.

History
The tournament was first held in 1983 when the conference began sponsoring softball. The tournament was not held from 1991 to 1995 and canceled due to the COVID-19 pandemic in 2020.

Champions

Year-by-year

Notes

 Former Southland members in italics.
 MVP from tournament champion team unless otherwise noted.

By school
Current Southland members in bold.

See also
Southland Conference baseball tournament

References

External links
Southland.org
 Southland Conference 2015 Softball